Raina Diane Telgemeier (born May 26, 1977) is an American cartoonist. Her works include the autobiographical webcomic Smile, which was published as a full-color middle grade graphic novel in February 2010, and the follow-up Sisters and the fiction graphic novel Drama, all of which have been on The New York Times Best Seller lists. She has also written and illustrated the graphic novels Ghosts and Guts as well as four graphic novels adapted from The Baby-Sitters Club stories by Ann M. Martin.

Telgemeier was born on May 26, 1977 in San Francisco and grew up there. She has two younger siblings, Amara and William. According to Telgemeier, she knocked out two front teeth while in sixth grade and needed braces and multiple surgeries as a result. She attended Lowell High School in San Francisco.

Telgemeier studied illustration at New York's School of Visual Arts; she graduated in 2002.

Career
After graduating from the School of Visual Arts, Telgemeier began attending small-press festivals such as the MoCCA Festival, selling self-published autobiographical stories and vignettes from her life. She produced seven mini-comics issues in the Take-Out series between 2002 and 2005. Each was a twelve-page black-and-white comic. Other early works include a short story in Bizarro World for DC Comics and a short story in Volume 4 of the Flight anthology.

In 2004, Telgemeier joined Girlamatic, a subscription-based webcomics site dedicated to female writers. Telgemeier has said that the disciplined structure and schedule of publishing a weekly webcomic encouraged her to develop the autobiographical story Smile.

Her main breakthrough into published comics came from creating graphic novel adaptations of Baby-Sitters Club novels. In a piece for Cosmopolitan, Telgemeier said that she met an editor from Scholastic at an art gallery party in 2004 who mentioned that Scholastic was thinking of setting up a graphic novel imprint. At that year's San Diego Comic-Con, Telgemeier met that editor's boss, who invited her to pitch an idea for Scholastic. After Telgemeier mentioned she had been a fan of Ann M. Martin's The Baby-Sitters Club series, they asked her to work up a graphic novel adaptation. Scholastic, though its imprint Graphix went on to publish four graphic novels in the series: Kristy's Great Idea, The Truth About Stacey, Mary Anne Saves the Day, and Claudia and Mean Janine. According to Telgemeier, the advances for the adaptations allowed Telgemeier to quit her full-time job and concentrate on her art, and she completed the fourth Baby-Sitters Club novel in 2008.

In 2009, Del Rey Manga released X-Men: Misfits, which Telgemeier co-authored with her then-husband, Dave Roman. It spent at least five weeks on the New York Times bestseller list for Paperback Graphic Books.

In February 2010, Telgemeier released a print graphic novel version of her webcomic Smile. Smile first featured on a New York Times bestseller list in 2011 and as of October 2020 it is still on the New York Times Bestseller List for Graphic Books and Manga.

Telgemeier followed Smile with several original graphic novels, all of which have made a New York Times Bestseller List:

 Drama, released in 2012, about a middle school stage crew and performers, was released. Although the novel was fictional, it drew on experiences from Telgemeier's experience in middle school and high school theater.
 Sisters, released in 2014, about her life growing up with her younger sister.
 Ghosts, released in 2016, about a girl who can see ghosts, and adventures in a new town during Day of the Dead.
 Guts, released in 2019, about Telgemeier's stomach problems and her adventures in food, school, and changing friendships.

Telgemeier has continued to contribute to anthologies, including Nursery Rhyme Comics (2011, First Second), Fairy Tale Comics (2013, First Second); the Explorer graphic novel series (2012, 2013, Abrams/Amulet); and Comics Squad: Recess! (2014, Random House).

Of her work, Telgemeier said, "I'm more aware than ever of what I want to say to kids through my books [...] it's going to be O.K. That everybody, with just a little bit of talking and a little bit of empathy, can find out that they have a lot in common."

In 2021, Salt & Straw partnered with Scholastic Inc. and made a line of Comics themed ice creams. Telgemeier's ice cream flavor was called "Smile: Words & Pictures" which Salt & Straw said was "A pencil-inspired yellow and pink almond-infused sponge cake and Stracciatella “pencil shavings'' are strewn about a notebook paper-esque canvas, in this case trusty vanilla ice cream."

Reception
As of 2019, Telgemeier's books collectively have more than 18 million copies in print. According to David Saylor, publisher at Graphix, "Raina single-handedly created the market for middle-grade graphic memoir". Telgemeier's work has won several awards and nominations, including five Eisner Awards, and has been included on many lists of recommended books.

Awards

Recommendation lists and bestseller lists 

All five of her original graphic novels have made a The New York Times Best Seller list, as has at least one of her Baby-Sitters Club adaptations and X-Men: Misfits. On May 10, 2015, the top four books on The New York Times Best Seller list for paperback graphic books were all by Telgemeier: Drama, Smile, Sisters, and Kristy's Great Idea. Smile first featured on a New York Times bestseller list in 2011 and as of October 2020 it is still on the New York Times Bestseller List for Graphic Books and Manga.

In 2017, Telgemeier was named the "Most Important Comics Creator" by Comics Worth Reading who cited her bookscan numbers, copies sold, and influence on the modern comics market as reasons why.

Challenges and bans 
According to the ALA, Drama was among the top ten most challenged book in libraries and schools in 2014, 2016, 2017, 2018, and 2019. Reasons given for challenges and bans have included having LGBTQIA+ content and characters, sexually explicit content, an "offensive political viewpoint", being "confusing", and for concerns that it goes against “family values/morals”.

Personal life 
Telgemeier was married to fellow cartoonist Dave Roman; they married in 2006 but they filed for divorce in 2015.

She currently lives in San Francisco, California. She has lived in Astoria, New York.

Bibliography

Author and illustrator 
 Take Out (2002-2005)
Smile (Scholastic/Graphix, 2010)
Drama (Scholastic/Graphix, 2012)
 Sisters (Scholastic/Graphix, 2014)
 Ghosts (Scholastic/Graphix, 2016)
 Guts (Scholastic/Graphix, 2019)

Illustrator

Babysitters Club graphic novels  
 Kristy's Great Idea (2006)
 The Truth About Stacey (2006)
 Mary Anne Saves the Day (2007)
 Claudia and Mean Janine (2008)

Author 
 X-Men: Misfits (2009), co-authored with Dave Roman

Contributions to anthologies 
Bizarro World HC (DC Comics, 2005)

Flight, Vol. 4 (2007)

Nursery Rhyme Comics (First Second, 2011)

Fairy Tale Comics (First Second, 2013)

The Explorer graphic novel series (Abrams/Amulet, 2012, 2013)

Comics Squad: Recess! (Random House, 2014)

References

General references
 Hart, James (February 24, 2005). "Superheroes get bizarre treatment". The Kansas City Star, Pg. G18.
 MacDonald, Heidi (April 18, 2005). "Young Cartoonists Look to the Book Market". Publishers Weekly, Pg. 23.
 Schou, Solvej (April 18, 2006). "Not the 1980s anymore: popular Baby-sitter's Club books go graphic". The Canadian Press, Entertainment and Culture.

Inline citations

External links

 
 Telgemeier at LiveJournal
 Interview at The Daily Cross Hatch, April 4, 2007
 Marvel, Del Rey Join to Produce OEL Manga With X-Men & Wolverine Newsarama, December 9, 2007
 2010 Boston Globe-Horn Book Awards The Horn Book, June 8, 2010
 
 

1977 births
Living people
American women cartoonists
American graphic novelists
American webcomic creators
American female comics artists
Female comics writers
Artists from San Francisco
People from Astoria, Queens
School of Visual Arts alumni
21st-century American novelists
American women novelists
21st-century American women writers
Writers from San Francisco
Artists from New York City
Writers from Queens, New York
Novelists from New York (state)
The Baby-Sitters Club
Eisner Award winners for Best Writer/Artist
American cartoonists